The 2019 Southern Jaguars football team represents Southern University in the 2019 NCAA Division I FCS football season. The Jaguars are led by seventh-year head coach Dawson Odums and play their home games at Ace W. Mumford Stadium in Baton Rouge, Louisiana as members of the West Division of the Southwestern Athletic Conference (SWAC).

Previous season

The Jaguars finished the 2018 season 7–4, 6–1 in SWAC play to finish in first place in the West Division. They lost the SWAC Championship Game to Alcorn State 28–37.

Preseason

Preseason polls
The SWAC released their preseason poll on July 16, 2019. The Jaguars were picked to finish in first place in the West Division.

Preseason all–SWAC teams
The Jaguars placed six players on the preseason all–SWAC teams.

Offense

1st team

Jodeci Harris – OL

2nd team

Devon Benn – RB

Jaylon Brinson – OL

Jeremias Houston – TE

Defense

1st team

Jordan Lewis – DL

2nd team

Montavious Gaines – DB

Roster

Schedule

Source:

Game summaries

at McNeese State

at Memphis

Edward Waters

at Florida A&M

at Arkansas–Pine Bluff

Prairie View A&M

vs. Texas Southern

at Alcorn State

Alabama A&M

Virginia–Lynchburg

at Jackson State

vs. Grambling State

at Alcorn State (SWAC Championship)

Ranking movements

References

Southern
Southern Jaguars football seasons
Southern Jaguars football